Butch is most often a term used to describe a lesbian, or sometimes a bisexual woman, who exhibits a masculine identity. 

Since the lesbian subculture of 1940s America, "butch" has been present as a way for lesbians to circumvent traditional genders of women in society and distinguish their masculine attributes and characteristics from feminine women.

History

The 1940s saw the rise of visible butch culture and butch lesbians who dressed in more masculine attire and acted in a more butch manner. This usually limited them to a few jobs, such as factory work and cab driving, that had no dress codes for women. During the 1950s with the anti-gay politics of the McCarthy era, there was an increase in violent attacks on gay and bisexual women, while at the same time the increasingly strong and defiant bar culture became more willing to respond with force. Although femmes also fought back, it became primarily the role of butches to defend against attacks and hold the bars as gay women's space. The prevailing butch image was severe but gentle, while it became increasingly tough and aggressive as violent confrontation became a fact of life.

See also
 Stone butch
 Soft butch

Notes

References

External links
  Butch is Not a Dirty Word magazine

English words
Butch and femme
Lesbian culture
Bisexual culture
Slang terms for women
Women and sexuality
LGBT terminology
Gender roles in the LGBT community